Robert Howe (3 August 1903 – 20 June 1979) was a Scottish footballer who played as a left winger.

Career
Born in Dumbarton, Howe played club football for Hamilton Academical, Hearts, Third Lanark, Queen of the South, St Johnstone and Dundee United, and made two appearances for Scotland – he was the first serving Hamilton player to be capped for his country.

At club level, his most notable achievements were winning Scottish Football League Division Two with Third Lanark in 1934–35 and reaching the final of the Scottish Cup with the club one year later (the match was lost to Rangers).

References

1903 births
1979 deaths
Scottish footballers
Sportspeople from Dumbarton
Footballers from West Dunbartonshire
Scotland international footballers
Hamilton Academical F.C. players
Heart of Midlothian F.C. players
Petershill F.C. players
Third Lanark A.C. players
Queen of the South F.C. players
Scottish Football League players
Scottish Junior Football Association players
St Johnstone F.C. players
Dundee United F.C. players
Association football wingers